Legionella maceachernii is a Gram-negative bacterium from the genus Legionella which was isolated from a potable water cistern. L. maceachernii can cause pneumonia.

References

Legionellales
Bacteria described in 1985